The Vainakh tower architecture, also called Nakh architecture, is a characteristic feature of ancient and medieval architecture of Chechnya and Ingushetia.

History
The oldest fortifications in the North Caucasus date from the 3rd millennium BC. The oldest remains of buildings with the characteristics of Nakh towers date from the 1st century AD, and can already be distinguished into residential and military types. Construction greatly increased in the 12th and 13th centuries. Nakh tower architecture and construction techniques reached their peak in the 15th–17th centuries. Vainakh architecture was introduced to north-eastern Georgia (Dartlo, Tusheti) by Vainakh builders.

General features
Typical Vainakh towers were built on a square base, ranging from 6 to 12 m wide and 10 to 25 m high, depending on the function. The walls were built of stone blocks, possibly with lime, clay-lime, or lime-sand mortar. The walls were inclined inwards and their thickness decreased on higher floors. The towers were built on hard rock.

Vainakh towers used to be sparingly decorated with religious or good-wishing petrographs, such as solar signs, depictions of the author’s hands, or animals.

The construction of a tower, whether residential or military, was accompanied by rituals. Songs and folk tales emphasize the role of the "master builder", who, according to tradition, would direct a group of assistants who did the actual work. Some of these masters had their names preserved—such as Diskhi, associated in the local tradition to the military tower of Vougi, and Yand of the Ingush settlement Erzi. Chechen villages, such as Bavloi also specialized in tower building. Legends ascribe to the master builder the honourable and extremely dangerous task of erecting the tsIurku stone that topped the step pyramidal roof of a military tower. A ladder was tied to a machicolation on the outside for the master to reach the roof. It cost many masters their life. In case of success, the client gave the master a bull. The construction of a family tower cost the household 50 to 60 cows.

Ivan Shcheblykin claimed that the tower builders did not need any scaffolding, and many researchers make that assumption. However, he may have meant that they used no scaffolding on the outside. Cornerstones were included in the design, to join the walls together and to support the higher floors. Interior scaffolds used in erecting the walls probably rested on those cornerstones, in which corbels were made for the purpose. Stones and beams were lifted with a windlass known as chIagIarg or zerazak. Large stones—some weighing several tons—were brought to the site by oxdriven sleds. The builders used many stonedressing tools—the berg (pick), the varzap (a large hammer), the jau (a small hammer), the daam (chisel), etc. Mortar was made on the site. Sand or clay was admixed to it in localities where lime was expensive. One of the master builder's most critical tasks was to estimate the proper amount of mortar to ensure the seismic resistance of the tower. Joints between stones were filled in with limewash for rain not to damage mortar.

Residential towers

Residential towers were family dwellings, which have been compared to structures seen in prehistoric mountain settlements dating back to 8000 BC.

The classic residential tower is a massive building, two to four stories high, with tapering walls and a flat shale roof. The floorplan is usually rectangular, measuring 8–10 by 8–12 meters. The tower tapered due to the walls getting thinner to the top, and due to their inward inclination. The thickness of the walls varies in different structures from 1.2–0.9 m at the bottom to 0.7–0.5 m at the top.

The walls were made of stones of varying sizes (blocks or slabs, depending on the local stone), carefully dressed on the outside, with lime or clay-lime mortar and chip stone. Dry masonry was seldom used. Large stone blocks, sometimes weighing several tons, were used in the foundation and the ground-floor walls.

The towers had a central pillar, also of thoroughly dressed stone blocks, which supported the ceiling rafters. Purlines rested on pilasters or cornerstones, and common rafters, in their turn, rested on the purlines. The upper floors consisted of wood sticks resting on the rafters, coated with punned clay. The ground floor was paved with boards or stone slabs.

Besides its structural function, the central pillar (erd-bogIam) had symbolic and religious significance in Vainakh culture, since ancient times.

The two lower stories of a residential tower were intended for livestock. Cattle and horses were usually sheltered in the ground floor, part of which was fenced off for grain storage. Some towers had pits on the ground floor for that purpose, with stone-lined walls and bottom.

In towers with four stories, the first floor above ground was typically used to shelter sheep and goats. It had a separate entrance, reached by a log ramp.

The family lived in the second floor above ground (or in the first, in three-story towers). The family possessions—carpets, dishes, kitchen utensils, clothes, etc.—were kept there, in tin-lined wooden chests or on wooden shelves along the walls. The older towers had no wardrobes; instead, clothes were hung on metal hooks. Other towers had niches on the walls for that purpose. There was usually an arrangement of weaponry on the wall above the master bed. It was a dire necessity in wartime, and mere tradition in peace.

Military towers
A majority of the military ("combat") towers in the Ingush and Chechen mountains functioned both as watchtowers and as signalling beacons. Some served as fortified guard posts, or as safe shelters for one or two families, which lived in nearby residential towers, against raids. In some places, such as at Mount Bekhaila, several towers were enclosed in a common wall to create a small fortress. Construction of military towers began in the 10th and 11th centuries, and peaked between the 14th and 17th centuries. Chechen and Ingush military towers are fairly similar, differing only in size and the construction time. Depending on their age, they differ also in the sophistication of construction techniques and stone dressing, and in the grace of form.

Combat towers were generally taller but narrower than residential ones: 20–25 meters high or more, with four of five floors and a square base 5–6 meters wide. They were built of dressed stone with lime or lime-sand mortar.

They had blank walls, cut only by embrasures and observation slits, on the most vulnerable side. There were no wooden parts on the tower exterior lest besiegers put them on fire. Doors and windows were on the side hardest of access. In some cases it is hard to believe that the defenders themselves could enter the tower. The entrance door was on the second floor, accessed through a ladder. The defenders fired at the enemy through loopholes and the top of the tower had machicolations–overhanging small balconies without a floor. Defensive towers were usually crowned with pyramid-shaped roofing built in steps and topping with a sharpened capstone.

Beacon towers were erected on the top of cliffs to make them hard of access. The shape, size and site of a beacon was chosen so as to guarantee visual connection with the nearest beacons. Watchtowers were often built in strategic locations to control key bridges, roads and mountain passes. They were built near to a river, brook or spring, so that water could be brought into the tower through a concealed water duct.

Special attention was paid to the dressing and finishing of the keystones at the top of doors and windows, called kurtulg ("proud stone"). They bore the name of the owner, and were frequently decorated with petroglyphs.

Researchers differ in the functions of the various floors. Some assume that the ground floor was used for livestock, while others say it was a prison for captives. Actually it seems that the ground floor was filled in with stone and earth to reinforce the tower bottom against ramming.

The classical combat tower was not intended to withstand long sieges. Tower defenders had only a small stock of food and extremely limited arsenals, be
it arrows, stone missiles or powder and shot in later times. Due to their small size, a watchtower or a beacon could house four to six on outsentry duty.
All combat tower stories were equipped for observation and fighting.

Chechen and Ingush combat towers divide in three basic groups according to the type of roof:
 Flat roof towers
 Flat roof towers crenellated on the corners
 Step pyramidal roof towers

Mixed function towers

In the 13th–14th centuries, increased danger of aggression in certain parts of the Ingush and Chechen mountains let to the reinforcement of residential towers. The result were buildings that combined the functions of residential and defensive towers; they were smaller in size than the former, but a bit wider than the latter. Like the military towers, they had loopholes and machicolations (mâchicoulis).

These mixed-function towers are rare in the Chechen highland, probably because tower complexes and castles had become widespread by the time this concept appeared. Whereas a tower had space for only a few cows and horses, a castle could give shelter to the entire livestock in wartime.

See also
 San Gimignano
 Tower house
Khevsureti, Tusheti, Ananuri
 Svanetia in Georgia: Svan towers
 Tower houses in the Balkans
 Nuraghi
 Irish round tower
 Himalayan Towers

References

Medieval architecture
Nakh culture
Nakh peoples